The Late Great Daniel Johnston: Discovered Covered is a 2004 Gammon Records two-disc set. The first disc features covers of Daniel Johnston songs by a variety of different artists.  The second disc features the original versions of these eighteen songs, as well as "Rock This Town", a previously unreleased Johnston track. It was curated and produced by Mark Linkous of Sparklehorse. Despite what the title and cover art may suggest, Johnston lived to see the album's release; he died fifteen years later in 2019.

Track listing
All tracks written by Daniel Johnston.

Disc 1:

Disc 2:

All tracks on this disc performed by Daniel Johnston.

References

2004 compilation albums
Daniel Johnston albums
Daniel Johnston tribute albums